Mucur is a town and district of Kırşehir Province in the Central Anatolia region of Turkey. According to 2000 census, population of the district is 24,945 of which 14,676 live in the town of Mucur.  It is known as a center for the production and sale of prayer rugs and other decorative rugs.

History
From 1867 until 1922, Mucur was part of Angora vilayet.

Notes

References

External links
 District municipality's official website 

 
Towns in Turkey
Populated places in Kırşehir Province